Vlorë air base  is located near Vlorë, Albania. It was constructed in the 1950s.

History 
Vlore is the second biggest port in Albania, after Durrës. Vlore was once the capital of Albania (now it is Tirana), and was the city in which the country received its Declaration of Independence on November 28, 1912.

History of Vlore Base 
The air base is south of the city of Vlore. The city is on the Adriatic coast in the southern region of Albania. It was built in 1950s and it is the home base of the Air Academy. The academy was built in 1962. In 1997 during the "lottery uprising", people came and destroyed the air base. The academy was rebuilt in 2002 to 2004 but the airbase wasn't. Instead, civilian homes were built over the airbase. And they also joined partnership with the academy of kucove and that helped that form runaway data. Rwy 16/34, Size: , Elev: , N40 28 33.78 E019 28 27.04, grass airfield. During WWII the airbase was being used by flying CR42s The airbase is 100 km from Tirana.

History of Albania Air force 
The Air force In Vlore couldn't happen without the help of the soviet union, they were named Forcat Ushtarake Ajore Shqipetare, known as Albania's  people army air force. The first plane was the Yak-9 fighters donated by the soviet union. Many pilots had gone through training of the Yak-18 in the ussr and then they were taken to Yugoslavia for more training of the Yak-3 planes before they were returned to Albania. The first pilot to fly in the Albanian forces is Petraq Polena born in Korca Albania. In 1955 the soviet union supplied 2 squadrons of jet fighters and with Mig-15UTI trainers. some of the aircraft are still used in today's Albania air force.

Runways
Main Runway: Rwy 16/34, Size: , Elev: , N40 28 33.78 E019 28 27.04, grass airfield.

Accidents and incidents
On 16 August 1969, a Douglas DC-3 of Olympic Airways was hijacked on a domestic flight from Ellinikon International Airport, Athens, Greece to Agrinion Airport. The aircraft, possibly registered SX-BBF, landed at Vlorë.

See also
List of airports in Albania

References

External links
 Airport record for Vlorë Airport at Landings.com

Airports in Albania
Buildings and structures in Vlorë